The North Newport River is a  tidal river in Liberty County in the U.S. state of Georgia.

See also
List of rivers of Georgia

References 

Rivers of Georgia (U.S. state)
Rivers of Liberty County, Georgia